Dragutin Ristić (born 5 August 1964) is a Croatian former footballer who played as a striker, currently coach of NK Medulin 1921.

Career

Player 
He spent most of his career playing for lower division clubs in Italy, and also played in Scotland, Portugal and Iceland.

Coach 
On 30 October 2012 he was named new coach of Kras in Serie D.

References

External links
 
 

1964 births
Living people
Sportspeople from Pula
Association football forwards
Yugoslav footballers
Croatian footballers
NK Istra players
FK Obilić players
FK Partizan players
F.C. Crotone players
F.C. Matera players
Benevento Calcio players
Dundee F.C. players
Falkirk F.C. players
Dundee United F.C. players
F.C. Tirsense players
U.S. Castrovillari Calcio players
Dragutin Ristic
F.S. Sestrese Calcio 1919 players
Rende Calcio 1968 players
S.S.D. Città di Brindisi players
Ravenna F.C. players
Scottish Football League players
Primeira Liga players
Úrvalsdeild karla (football) players
Yugoslav expatriate footballers
Expatriate footballers in Italy
Yugoslav expatriate sportspeople in Italy
Croatian expatriate footballers
Croatian expatriate sportspeople in Italy
Expatriate footballers in Scotland
Croatian expatriate sportspeople in Scotland
Expatriate footballers in Portugal
Croatian expatriate sportspeople in Portugal
Expatriate footballers in Iceland
Croatian expatriate sportspeople in Iceland
Croatian football managers
NK Istra managers